Sheref Sabawy is a Canadian politician, who was elected to the Legislative Assembly of Ontario in the 2018 provincial election. He represents the riding of Mississauga—Erin Mills as a member of the Progressive Conservative Party of Ontario.

Sabawy is a member of the Standing Committee on General Government.  He serves as the Parliamentary Assistant to the Minister of Heritage, Sport, Tourism, and Culture Industries.

Before running as a PC, Sabawy unsuccessfully ran for the Liberal Party of Canada nomination for the federal district of Mississauga—Erin Mills in the 2015 federal election.

Electoral record

References

Progressive Conservative Party of Ontario MPPs
Politicians from Mississauga
Living people
Canadian politicians of Egyptian descent
21st-century Canadian politicians
1965 births